Majengo may refer to:

 Majengo (Mbeya ward), in Mbeya Region, Tanzania
 Majengo (Dodoma ward), in Dodoma Region, Tanzania
 Majengo (Singida Urban), in Singida Urban region, Tanzania
 Majengo (Moshi Urban ward), in Kilimanjaro Region, Tanzania
Majengo, Mombasa, a suburb of Mombasa, Kenya
Majengo, Nairobi, a suburb of Nairobi, Kenya